Namsos Idrettslag is a Norwegian sports club from Namsos, Nord-Trøndelag, founded on 28 November 1904. It has sections for association football, alpine skiing and ski jumping.

The men's football team currently plays in the Fourth Division, the fifth tier of Norwegian football, after being relegated from the Third Division in 2011. It last played in the Second Division in 1999.

References

 Official site, football 

Football clubs in Norway
Sport in Trøndelag
Namsos
Association football clubs established in 1904

1904 establishments in Norway